Dresden From the Right Bank of the Elbe Above the Augustus Bridge is an oil on canvas by the Italian urban landscape painter Bernardo Bellotto. Painted in 1747, it depicts the view of Dresden from the right bank of the River Elbe, including the Dresden Frauenkirche, the Dresden Cathedral, and the Augustus Bridge. One year later, he painted another piece titled Dresden From the Right Bank of the Elbe Below the Augustus Bridge, looking in the other direction from below the Augustus Bridge. Both of the paintings are in the permanent collection of the Gemäldegalerie Alte Meister. The paintings have proved invaluable in rebuilding parts of the city that were destroyed during World War II.

Lists of replicas

Between 1751 and 1753, Bellotto also executed smaller replicas of the two paintings. There are some other replicas from his own hand.

 View of Dresden with the Frauenkirche at Left, 1747, North Carolina Museum of Art.
 Dresden From the Right Bank of the Elbe Above the Augustus Bridge, ca. 1750, National Gallery of Ireland.
 Dresden From the Right Bank of the Elbe Above the Augustus Bridge, 1751–53, Private Collection. Lent to the Getty Museum since 2016.

Also, there are some replicas from his followers, but the painting techniques are much rougher.

Gallery

See also
 Bombing of Dresden in World War II

References

1747 paintings
Collections of the Gemäldegalerie Alte Meister
Paintings in the collection of the North Carolina Museum of Art
Paintings by Bernardo Bellotto
Churches in art
Water in art
Collection of the National Gallery of Ireland